Hambleton railway station was a railway station on the Leeds and Selby Railway in North Yorkshire, England. The station was opened with the line in 1834, closed to passengers in 1959 and then to goods in 1964. It was used sporadically in the 1970s as an embarkation point when  station was undergoing refurbishment. The site of the station has been partly demolished by a new railway spur built in 1983.

History
The station was opened up to goods traffic in December 1834, and was furnished with a goods shed on the south side which had a west facing connection. At the opening of the station, first-class tickets to Leeds cost three shillings, and second-class cost two shillings. The next stop eastwards was Selby, the original final stop, which cost one shilling to travel to for first-class passengers, and sixpence for second-class.

The state of the "road" was given as the cause of the accident. In 1894, the Railway Clearing House Handbook listed Hambleton as dealing in passengers, general goods and livestock with no indication of a steam crane. In 1904, the same updated publication also mentioned the addition of horse boxes and a steam crane with the capability of lifting .

The station was closed to passengers on 14 September 1959, and then to goods on 7 September 1964, though the site was used for passengers briefly in March 1975, and again in July 1980 when Selby station was undergoing a refurbishment or was closed. The southern side of the station site has been built over as part of Hambleton Junction, a spur built in 1983 from the Selby Diversion to the Leeds line. The line through the station site is still open, with the route of the Leeds to Selby railway carrying trains between Leeds, Selby and Hull.

Services
At the opening of the line in 1834, services amounted to four each way with just two on Sundays. In 1866, the station was served by three passenger trains per day each way, with an extra stop on Mondays for the Selby market traffic. By 1882, this had doubled to six trains each way, all going to Leeds (New) station, running on the through platforms at Marsh Lane station in Leeds. By 1944, the traffic was down to three trains each, in either direction, which by 1946, had been improved again with nine services calling each way.

Notes

References

External links
Image of the station in the 1950s

Former Leeds and Selby Railway stations
Railway stations in Great Britain closed in 1964
Disused railway stations in North Yorkshire
Railway stations in Great Britain opened in 1834